The Herchel Smith Professorship of Pure Mathematics is a professorship in pure mathematics at the University of Cambridge. It was established in 2004 by a benefaction from Herchel Smith "of £14.315m, to be divided into five equal parts, to support the full endowment of five Professorships in the fields of Pure Mathematics, Physics, Biochemistry, Molecular Biology, and Molecular Genetics." When the position was advertised in 2004, the first holder was expected to focus on mathematical analysis.

List of Herchel Smith Professors of Pure Mathematics 

 2006–2013 Ben J. Green
 2019–present Pierre Raphael

References

Report of the General Board on the establishment of a Herchel Smith Professorship of Pure Mathematics, Cambridge University Reporter, 3 March 2004
University left 'biggest' bequest, BBC News, 25 June 2002
Cambridge benefits from £50m Pill legacy, telegraph.co.uk, 26 June 2002

Pure Mathematics, Smith, Herchel
Faculty of Mathematics, University of Cambridge
2004 establishments in England
Pure Mathematics, Smith, Herchel
Mathematics education in the United Kingdom